Milan Blagojević may refer to:
 Milan Blagojevic (soccer) (born 1969), Australian football player
 Milan Blagojević (basketball) (born 1929), Serbian basketball player
 Milan Blagojević Španac (1905–1941), Yugoslav military officer
 Milan Blagojević - Namenska, Serbian chemical defense company
 Milan Blagojevic (jurist), Serbian jurist

Blagojevic, Milan